The Old Victoria Custom House or Malahat Building, in Victoria was completed in 1875 and designated as a historic building in 1987. It is a three-storey, mansard-roofed, custom house overlooking Victoria's harbour, symbolic of the time when Victoria was the pre-eminent commercial centre on Canada's West Coast. The building is described by the Historic Sites and Monuments Board of Canada as a "relatively plain example of the imposing Second Empire style adopted for these buildings under Thomas Seaton Scott, first Chief Architect of the Department of Public Works (1872-1881). Its modest design and materials are in keeping with the relative size of Victoria at that time."

See also 
 List of historic places in Victoria, British Columbia

References 

Buildings and structures in Victoria, British Columbia
National Historic Sites in British Columbia
Buildings and structures on the National Historic Sites of Canada register
Government buildings completed in 1875
Custom houses
Second Empire architecture in Canada